Skapti Þóroddsson (died 1030) was an Icelandic lawspeaker and skald. He became lawspeaker in 1004, succeeding his uncle Grímr when the latter's voice failed him. He held office till his death in 1030, longer than anyone else. According to the Íslendingabók he instituted judicial reform by establishing the "fifth court", a national court of appeals.

According to the Skáldatal, Skapti was a court poet of Hákon Sigurðarson but no details on that career are known. According to the Heimskringla, he composed a poem on king Óláfr Haraldsson and sent his son Steinn to perform it for the king.

The only piece of poetry by Skapti which has come down to us is decidedly Christian and can not have been composed at Hákon's court. Snorri Sturluson cites the following half-stanza by Skapti in a discussion of Christian kennings in the Skáldskaparmál.

Skapti is mentioned in some of the Icelanders' sagas, for example Njáls saga where he is insulted by Skarphéðinn Njálsson.

References
Íslendingabók Finnur Jónsson's edition
Lovsigemandsrækken
Skapti Þóroddsson
Skáldskaparmál Brodeur's translation
Ólafs saga helga

Lawspeakers
10th-century Icelandic poets
11th-century Icelandic poets
1030 deaths
Year of birth unknown